Zelda may refer to:

Places 
 Zelda, Kentucky, unincorporated community, United States

People
Zelda (given name), a female given name

Arts and entertainment

Media
 The Legend of Zelda, a video game franchise
 Zelda (Game & Watch), a 1989 Game & Watch system
 Zelda (band), a Japanese rock band in the 1980s and 1990s
 Zelda (film), a 1993 television movie
 Zelda, a 1970 book by Nancy Milford about Zelda Fitzgerald

Fictional characters
 Princess Zelda, the titular character in The Legend of Zelda video game series
 Zelda, in Stephen King's book Pet Sematary and the film adaptation
 Zelda, the main villainess in the British TV series Terrahawks
 Zelda, the main villainess in the 1998 direct-to-video film The Swan Princess: The Mystery of the Enchanted Kingdom
 Zelda Cruz, a character in the American web series Zombie College
 Zelda Gilroy, in the 1959–1963 TV series The Many Loves of Dobie Gillis
 Zelda Kay, in the Island at War television mini-series
 Zelda Reginhard, in the anime and manga series Lotte no Omocha!
 Zelda Schiff, Head Librarian in The Magicians (U.S. TV series)
 Zelda Spellman, Sabrina's aunt in Sabrina, the Teenage Witch
 Zelda Spooner, in Billy Wilder's 1964 comedy film Kiss Me, Stupid
 Zelda, the dog mascot of Nickelodeon Magazine
 Zelda, the pet vulture in the 1964 TV series The Addams Family

Other uses 
 Zelda (turkey), the wild turkey resident in Battery Park, Manhattan
 Zelda (זלדה), Israel Defense Forces soldiers' nickname for the M113 Armored Personnel Carrier
 Typhoon Zelda, two tropical cyclones

See also